Warsaw is one of the most important education centres of Poland. It is home to four major universities and over 62 smaller schools of higher education. The overall number of students of all grades of education in Warsaw is almost 500,000 (29.2% of the city population; 2002). The number of university students is over 255,000. 

The University of Warsaw (Uniwersytet Warszawski, 55,000 students, 19 faculties) was established in 1816, when the partitions of Poland separated Warsaw from the oldest and most influential Polish academic center, in Kraków. Warsaw University of Technology (Politechnika Warszawska, 31,000 students, 18 faculties) is the second academic school of technology in the country, and one of the largest in Central Europe, employing 2,000 professors. It was established in 1898 as the Nicolas II's Technical Institute, in 1915 changed the name at the present one. Other institutions for higher education:
 Medical University of Warsaw (Warszawski Uniwersytet Medyczny, the largest medical school in Poland and one of the most prestigious – established in 1950 as the Medical Academy (earlier a medicine was being lectured at the Medical Faculty of the University of Warsaw), the present name obtained in 2008; 10,000 students, 4 faculties;
 National Defence University University (AON), highest military academic institution in Poland, established in 1951, it has 7 faculties;
 Fryderyk Chopin University of Music (Uniwersytet Muzyczny Fryderyka Chopina), the oldest and largest music school in Poland, and one of the largest in Europe, established in 1810, it has 6 faculties;
 Warsaw School of Economics (SGH), the oldest and most renowned economic university in the country, established in 1906 as “August Zieliński’s Men’s Private Trade Courses”, the present name obtained in 1916, but between 1949 and 1991 had the name “Main School of Planning and Statistics”; 18,000 students; there’s no faculties, all the professors work in the colleges (there is 5 of them) and the educational programs are being made by the whole university, not by a given college;
 University of Life Science (SGGW) - the largest agricultural university founded in 1816 as the Agronomic Institute, since 1840 – Institute of Forestry and Farming, since 1919 – the Main School of Farming (this is still the university’s name in Polish); 30,000 students, 13 faculties;
 Academy of Physical Education (AWF) – established in 1929 as the Central Institute of Physical Education, the present name obtained in 1949; it has 3 faculties.

The Copernicus Science Centre, a science museum, is located on the bank of the Vistula River in Warsaw. It contains over 450 interactive exhibits that enable visitors to single-handedly carry out experiments and discover the laws of science for themselves. The Centre is the largest institution of its type in Poland and one of the most advanced in Europe.

List of scientific institutions in Warsaw

The most important scientific institutions in the city are:
University of Warsaw (Uniwersytet Warszawski)
Warsaw University of Technology (Politechnika Warszawska)
Cardinal Stefan Wyszyński University (Uniwersytet Stefana kardynała Wyszyńskiego)
Medical University of Warsaw (Warszawski Uniwersytet Medyczny)
War Studies University
Fryderyk Chopin University of Music (Uniwersytet Muzyczny Fryderyka Chopina)
Theatre Academy (Akademia Teatralna im. Aleksandra Zelwerowicza)
Warsaw School of Economics (Szkoła Główna Handlowa) (former name - Szkoła Główna Planowania i Statystyki)
Warsaw Agricultural University (Szkoła Główna Gospodarstwa Wiejskiego)
Warsaw Academy of Fine Arts (Akademia Sztuk Pięknych)
Józef Piłsudski University of Physical Education in Warsaw (Akademia Wychowania Fizycznego Józefa Piłsudskiego w Warszawie)
 University of Social Sciences and Humanities (SWPS Uniwersytet Humanistycznospołeczny)
 Branches in Wrocław, Sopot, Poznań, and Katowice

Other (mostly community-run and private) schools include:

 Collegium Civitas
 Collegium Humanum – Warsaw Management University
 Vistula University
 Europejska Akademia Sztuk
 European School of Law and Administration (ESLA)
 Olympus Szkoła Wyższa im. Romualda Kudlińskiego (former name - Wyższa Szkoła Bankowości, Finansów i Zarządzania im. prof. Romualda Kudlińskiego)
 Branches in Łódź and Stalowa Wola
 Pedagogium - Wyższa Szkoła Pedagogiki Resocjalizacyjnej
 Polsko-Japońska Wyższa Szkoła Technik Komputerowych
 Branch in Bytom
 Prywatna Wyższa Szkoła Businessu i Administracji
 Szkoła Wyższa im. Bogdana Jańskiego
 Branches in Chełm, Elbląg and Kraków
 Szkoła Wyższa Mila College
 Szkoła Wyższa Przymierza Rodzin
 Szkoła Wyższa Rzemiosł Artystycznych
 Szkoła Wyższa Warszawska
 Warszawska Szkoła Biznesu
 Warszawska Szkoła Zarządzania - Szkoła Wyższa
 Warszawska Wyższa Szkoła Ekonomiczna
 Wszechnica Polska - Szkoła Wyższa TWP
 Wyższa Szkoła Administracyjno - Społeczna
 Wyższa Szkoła Celna
 Wyższa Szkoła Działalności Gospodarczej
 Wyższa Szkoła Dziennikarska im. M. Wańkowicza
 Branch in Lublin

 Wyższa Szkoła - Edukacja w Sporcie
 Sport and Leisure Institute in Wrocław
 Wyższa Szkoła Ekologii i Zarządzania
 Wyższa Szkoła Ekonomiczna
 Branch in Koszalin
 Wyższa Szkoła Ekonomiczno-Informatyczna
 Wyższa Szkoła Finansów i Zarządzania
 Wyższa Szkoła Gospodarowania Nieruchomościami
 Branches in Białystok and Gdańsk
 Wyższa Szkoła Handlu i Finansów Międzynarodowych
 Wyższa Szkoła Handlu i Prawa im. Ryszarda Łazarskiego
 Wyższa Szkoła Hotelarstwa, Gastronomii i Turystyki
 Wyższa Szkoła Informatyki Stosowanej i Zarządzania
 Wyższa Szkoła Informatyki, Zarządzania i Administracji
 Wyższa Szkoła Infrastruktury i Zarządzania Rolnictwem
 Wyższa Szkoła Języków Obcych i Zarządzania Finansami "Avans"
 Wyższa Szkoła Komunikowania i Mediów Społecznych im. Jerzego Giedroycia
 Wyższa Szkoła Menedżerska SIG
 Branch in Ciechanów
 Wyższa Szkoła Nauk Społecznych im. Ks. J. Majki
 Wyższa Szkoła Organizacji Turystyki i Hotelarstwa
 Wyższa Szkoła Pedagogiczna TWP
 Branches in Olsztyn, Katowice, Człuchów, Wałbrzych; divisions in Lublin, Szczecin and Wałbrzych
 Wyższa Szkoła Pedagogiczna ZNP
 Wyższa Szkoła Promocji
 Wyższa Szkoła Przedsiębiorczości i Zarządzania im. Leona Koźmińskiego
 Wyższa Szkoła Społeczno-Ekonomiczna
 Wyższa Szkoła Stosunków Międzynarodowych i Amerykanistyki
 Wyższa Szkoła Sztuk Wizualnych i Nowych Mediów
 Wyższa Szkoła Techniczno-Ekonomiczna
 Wyższa Szkoła Turystyki i Hotelarstwa
 Wyższa Szkoła Turystyki i Języków Obcych
 Wyższa Szkoła Turystyki i Rekreacji
 Wyższa Szkoła Ubezpieczeń i Bankowości
 Wyższa Szkoła Zarządzania
 Wyższa Szkoła Zarządzania i Prawa
 Branch in Płońsk
 Wyższa Szkoła Zarządzania Personelem
 Wyższa Szkoła Zawodowa Kosmetyki i Pielęgnacji Zdrowia
 Wyższa Warszawska Szkoła Humanistyczna
 Społeczna Wyższa Szkoła Przedsiębiorczości i Zarządzania in Łódź, Branch in Warsaw

References